Kawerau is a town in the Bay of Plenty Region on the North Island of New Zealand. It is situated 100 km south-east of Tauranga and 58 km east of Rotorua. It is the seat of the Kawerau District Council, and the only town in Kawerau District.

Kawerau is a small community, with an economy that is largely driven by the nearby pulp and paper mill that is run by Norske Skog and OJI Fibre Solutions. It is located along State Highway 34, southwest of Onepu, and is the terminus of the East Coast Main Trunk Railway, and the commencing point of the Murupara Branch railway.

Kawerau was one of the worst-affected towns in the 1987 Edgecumbe earthquake.

History and culture

European settlement

Kawerau, one of the youngest towns in New Zealand, was founded in 1953 as a mill town for the new Tasman pulp and paper mill. The site for the mill was chosen because of the ready availability of geothermal energy, water from the Tarawera River and the large supply of pine timber from the nearby Kaingaroa Forest.

Unlike most other towns of its size, Kawerau was carefully planned before construction. The town was built with an impressive number of facilities, to accommodate a multinational specialist workforce. The mill continues to drive the local economy and greatly influences the fortunes of the town. The town's population peaked in the early 1980s (8718 in the 1981 census) but has declined significantly since then due to the restructuring of the mill and of associated industries.

Recent history
In 2012 mill owner Norske Skog said it would be shutting one of the two newsprint machines at the mill. In January 2013 it was confirmed nearly half the mill's jobs would be lost.

Norse Skog of Norway which is the world's second biggest producer of newsprint confirmed closure of one of its two paper machines at the Tasman Mill at Kawerau with the loss of 110 jobs. The company first announced its intention to shut one machine last September, following a review of its newsprint capacity in Australasia. The remaining Tasman machine would continue to produce newsprint predominantly for the New Zealand and Australian markets. Norske Skog management would work closely with employees, unions and other stakeholders on the detailed closure arrangements, including a mill-wide restructuring programme. Peter McCartey, General Manager of Tasman Mill said it was widely understood the decision had been brought about by global market forces within the industry. The second paper machine had operated successfully for over 50 years. Norske Skog has the widest geographical spread of all the paper producers, with mills in 11 countries on all continents except Africa. 

As of July 16th 2021 all of the three newsprint paper machines have ceased operation due to less demand as the world is going digital.

Kawerau is also home to geothermal power supply Kawerau Power Station for the local industry as well as the rest of New Zealand.

Marae

The local marae, Tohia o te Rangi, is affiliated with the Ngāti Tūwharetoa hapū of Ngāi Tamarangi. It features the Waitaha Ariki Kore meeting house.

Demographics 

Kawerau District had a population of 7,146 at the 2018 New Zealand census, an increase of 783 people (12.3%) since the 2013 census, and an increase of 225 people (3.3%) since the 2006 census. There were 2,499 households, comprising 3,540 males and 3,606 females, giving a sex ratio of 0.98 males per female. The median age was 38.2 years (compared with 37.4 years nationally), with 1,716 people (24.0%) aged under 15 years, 1,275 (17.8%) aged 15 to 29, 2,733 (38.2%) aged 30 to 64, and 1,425 (19.9%) aged 65 or older.

Ethnicities were 52.3% European/Pākehā, 61.7% Māori, 4.6% Pacific peoples, 3.0% Asian, and 1.1% other ethnicities. People may identify with more than one ethnicity.

The percentage of people born overseas was 10.1, compared with 27.1% nationally.

Although some people chose not to answer the census's question about religious affiliation, 48.9% had no religion, 29.5% were Christian, 9.6% had Māori religious beliefs, 0.5% were Hindu, 0.2% were Muslim, 0.3% were Buddhist and 1.1% had other religions.

Of those at least 15 years old, 390 (7.2%) people had a bachelor's or higher degree, and 1,542 (28.4%) people had no formal qualifications. The median income was $20,600, compared with $31,800 nationally. 426 people (7.8%) earned over $70,000 compared to 17.2% nationally. The employment status of those at least 15 was that 1,857 (34.2%) people were employed full-time, 684 (12.6%) were part-time, and 549 (10.1%) were unemployed.

Geography 
The Tarawera River straddles Kawerau to the east and continues north to the Bay of Plenty. Water is supplied to the town from two natural springs. Kawerau's water was judged the best-tasting in New Zealand in 2003 and 2004.

Kawerau has access to vast geothermal resources. There are a number of geothermal hot springs in the surrounding bush owned and operated by local families. The Kawerau geothermal field provides steam power for the paper mill, and a 90 MW geothermal power station is currently under construction.

It is completely surrounded by the Whakatāne District.

Climate 

During summer (December to February), the average daily maximum temperature in Kawerau is 23.7 °C. In January 2008, the temperature exceeded 30 °C on five days. In winter (July to August) crisp early morning frosts are usually followed by clear, sunny days, and the average daily maximum temperature is around 15.6 °C.

Rainfall is spread throughout the year, though it is not uncommon to experience a drought during summer.

Events 

Kawerau hosts a number of events each year, including the National Woodskills Festival, 'King of the Mountain' race and the Tarawera 100 motorcycle endurance race.  Kawerau is also growing as an event venue for white water rapid competitions such as kayaking and rafting.  Kawerau was a venue for the 2013 World Rafting Championships.

Kawerau Woodfest & National Woodskills Competition 
The National Woodskills Festival is a competition that encompasses a broad spectrum of wood craftsmanship and wood art. Some of the competitors are professionals but many are amateurs. The Woodskills Festival was first held in Kawerau in 1989 as a local competition. By 1991, the event had become such a popular annual competition that it was developed into a national event, attracting exhibitors  from throughout New Zealand.  The competition has now developed into a broader range of attractions which captivates many skills from the Forestry Industry and now takes over the town for the weekend, in what is known as Kawerau Woodfest.

The annual Kawerau Woodfest attracts hundreds of visitors from around the country making it the town's largest event and as a result is the highest economic beneficial event in Kawerau. As well as the Woodskills Festival there is an Arts & Crafts Festival with displays open on Saturday and Sunday at various venues around Kawerau.

Education

The Kawerau Teen Parent Unit is located in an old school house.

Notable residents

Danielle Hayes, model
Gill Gatfield, sculptor
John Rowles, singer
Ria van Dyke, model
Sarah Walker, Women's BMX world champion

See also
Kawerau geothermal power station
Tasman Mill

References

External links
KawerauNZ.com
Kawerau District Council website

Kawerau District
Territorial authorities of New Zealand
Populated places in the Bay of Plenty Region
Populated places established in 1953